Zef Kol Ndoka (1883-1924), also known among Albanians as Zefi i Vogël, was an Albanian warrior and commander from the Shengji family from today's Fan Mirdita in Northern Albania.

Life
Born in 1883, somewhere around Gjakova, he grew up fighting against the Ottoman Empire during the Albanian National Awakening in 1912 and continued to fight for the liberation of Kosovo against Serbo-Montenegrin forces in the 1920s. Ndoka fought with Isa Boletini, Bajram Curri, Hasan Prishtina and others who alongside them was a leader of the Albanian Revolt of 1912 that captured Usküb (modern Skopje). Ndoka along with Mehmet Shpendi and Bajram Daklani raised the Albanian flag in Skopje on 12 August 1912. After the Albanian independence of 1912 his group he immediately began fighting the Kingdom of Yugoslavia together with Bajram Curri in order to unite Kosovo with Albania. Zefi died in 1924 fighting the Yugoslav forces.

Zefi was one of key figures for the gathering of the Albanian highlanders of Gjakova and Mirdita against the Ottoman Empire. Today he is a venerated figure in the Mirdita region.

References

1880s births
1924 deaths
Kosovo Albanians
Military personnel from Gjakova
People from Kosovo vilayet
Activists of the Albanian National Awakening
Albanian people in the Ottoman Empire